Boconnoc is a civil parish in Cornwall, England, United Kingdom, approximately four miles east of the town of Lostwithiel. According to the 2011 census the parish had a population of 96.

The parish is rural in character and is fairly well wooded. It is bordered to the west by St Winnow parish, to the south by St Veep parish, to the southeast and east by Lanreath parish, and to the north by Braddock parish. The hamlets of Couch's Mill and Brooks are in the parish. Part of ancient deer park at Boconnoc House contains an internationally important assemblage of lichens and is one of the most important sites in Europe for lichens.

History
There are Cornish crosses in the churchyard, on Druids' Hill and in Boconnoc Park. The latter cross was removed to here from Lanlivery and has some curious incised ornament.

The manor of Boconnoc is listed in the Domesday Book of 1086 as Bochenod, and was then one of the many hundred possessions of Robert, Count of Mortain, the half-brother of King William the Conqueror. Robert's tenant was a Briton named as "Offers", elsewhere in the Domesday Book named "Offels, Offerd, Offers, Osfert, Osfertus", and now known as "Osfrith of Okehampton" in Devon. In 1086 Osfrith held in total 12 manors in Devon and Cornwall, and before the Norman Conquest of 1066 had held 20. The holder in 1268 was De Cant.

(Daunay)
Much confusion exists in sources concerning the tenure of Boconnoc, if any, by the Daunay family. The period concerned (14th/15th centuries) overlaps with tenure of Boconnoc by the Carminowe family, quoted in possibly more reputable sources (including the History of Parliament biographical series), and supported by events recorded in primary sources (see below). The principal source for Daunay tenure of Boconnoc appears to be The Parochial History of Cornwall: Founded on the Manuscript Histories of Mr Hals and Mr Tonkin (1838), which appears to be unreliable. The Hals and Tonkin narrative was repeated by Delderfield, West Country Historic Houses and their Families (1968). The Hals and Tonkin narrative states that the last in the male line was Sir John Dawnay (d.1346/7) of Sheviock, Mudford Terry and Hinton in Somerset who married Sybil Treverbyn. His daughter and heiress was Emeline (or Emme) Dawney (or Dauney, Daunay, etc.) (c.1329-1371/2), who married 
Sir Edward de Courtenay (d.1371) of Goodrington, Devon, and thus the many Dauney estates (supposedly including Boconnoc) passed to her husband and their Courtenay descendants. The genealogy is correct but it appears that Boconnoc was not part of the Daunay inheritance. Boconnoc in fact passed to the Courtenay family two generations later, on the marriage of Sir Hugh Courtenay (d.1471) (grandson of Edward Courtenay of Goodrington) to Margaret Carminowe, the heiress of Boconnoc (see below).

Carminow

In the 14th century Boconnoc was held by the de Carminow family of Carminow / Carminoe / Carminowe in the parish of Mawgan-in-Meneage, Cornwall (56 km S-W of Boconnoc). In the church of St Mawgan, Mawgan-in-Meneage, survive the recumbent stone effigies of Sir Roger de Carminowe (d.1308) and his wife Johanna, originally situated in the family's chapel between Mawgan and Gunwalloe. Sir Roger de Carminowe fought under King Edward I in his Scottish wars and served as a Knight of the Shire for Cornwall in 1300.

Sir Ralph Carminowe (c.1339-1386) of Carminowe and Boconnoc, served thrice as MP for Cornwall, in 1383, 1384 and 1386.<ref>History of Parliament biography, Carminowe, Sir Ralph (bef.1339-1386), of Carminowe and Boconnoc, Cornw., published in The History of Parliament: the House of Commons 1386-1421, ed. J.S. Roskell, L. Clark, C. Rawcliffe., 1993 </ref> He was the son and heir of Sir Walter Carminowe of Carminowe by his wife Alice Tintern, and was the great nephew of the prominent Oliver Carminowe (1274-1343), MP, Knight of the Shire for Cornwall in 1314, Sheriff of Cornwall and Keeper of Launceston Castle. He married twice, firstly to Katherine Champernowne, a daughter and co-heiress of Sir William Champernowne, MP, of Tywardreath in Cornwall, and lord of the manor of Ilfracombe in Devon; secondly he married a certain Alice, the widow successively of John FitzRoger and Sir Edmund Clevedon, MP, of Clevedon in Somerset. He had one daughter, Alice, who predeceased him.

Sir Ralph Carminowe's residence at Boconnoc is recorded not only in his inquisition post mortem, but also in various law suits and petitions. In the 1370s Boconnoc was broken into by a band of men sent by John Cergeaux, Sheriff of Cornwall and Carminowe's brother-in-law, who had "viciously assaulted him and his wife, stolen £200 worth of goods, and left him for dead". Later Cergeaux "attached Carminowe and took more of his possessions, this time to the alleged value of £1,000". In response to these assaults Carminowe petitioned the Black Prince (Duke of Cornwall) and the King against John Cergeaux. In 1381 further records witness Carminowe's residence at Boconnoc, namely a royal commission which found that William de Botreaux, 1st Baron Botreaux with a band of 80 men had broken into Carminowe's deer park at Boconnoc and had killed 20 of his deer and "generally damaged his property". In his defence it was stated that Botreaux had been  on military service in Portugal at the time of the event, and that the accusation was false. Carminowe met a gruesome end in a hunting accident on 9 October 1386, having been "by a brace of greyhounds pulled over a cliff and died". His Latin will is transcribed in Dunkin's Monumental Brasses of Cornwall (1882). He was buried in St Lalluwy's Church, Menheniot, Cornwall (14 km east of Boconnoc), in which survives his small monumental brass (without effigy), said to be the earliest brass in Cornwall, inscribed in Latin: Orate pro anima domini Radulphi Carmynow militis cuius animae propicietur deus amen ("pray ye all for the soul of Sir Ralph Carminowe, knight, on whose soul may God look favourably Amen"). He named his heir as  his brother William Carminowe (c.1356-1408).
William Carminowe (c.1356-1408) married Margaret Kelly, a daughter of Nicholas Kelly of Ladock, and was eventually succeeded by his second son Thomas Carminowe (1394-1442).
Thomas Carminowe (1394-1442) married Jane Hill, a daughter of Robert Hill, by whom he left two daughters and co-heiresses:
Joan Carminowe, who married Sir Thomas Carew of Mohuns Ottery in Devon;
Margaret Carminowe (d.1412/13), who married three times: firstly to Sir John de Sancto Laudo (de St Lo); secondly to William de Botreaux; thirdly to Sir Hugh Courtenay II (d.1471) "of Boconnoc", twice MP for Cornwall, in 1446 and 1449, who was killed at the Battle of Tewkesbury in 1471, together with John Courtenay, 7th Earl of Devon (d.1471), the grandson of his first cousin the 4th Earl, and last in the senior line. Sir Hugh Courtenay II (d.1471) "of Boconnoc" was the son and heir of Sir Hugh Courtenay I (1358-1425) of Haccombe in Devon, the younger brother of Edward de Courtenay, 3rd/11th Earl of Devon (1357–1419), "The Blind Earl". Thus Boconnoc passed into the Courtenay family.

Courtenay

Sir Edward de Courtenay of Goodrington was the second son of Hugh de Courtenay, 2nd/10th Earl of Devon (1303–1377), of Tiverton Castle in Devon and of Okehampton Castle in Devon, feudal baron of Okehampton, and feudal baron of Plympton. By his wife Emeline Dauney he was the father of Edward de Courtenay, 3rd/11th Earl of Devon (1357–1419), "The Blind Earl", the ancestor of the 4th, 5th, 6th and 7th Earls, which senior line was extinguished during the Wars of the Roses, the last of whom was killed in the Battle of Tewkesbury in 1471. Sir Edward de Courtenay's second son (and therefore the brother of "The Blind Earl") was Sir Hugh Courtenay (1358-1425) of Haccombe in Devon, Sheriff of Devon for 1418/19 and thrice knight of the shire for Devon in 1395, 1397 and 1421, the grandfather of Edward Courtenay, 1st Earl of Devon (d.1509), KG, created Earl of Devon in 1485 by King Henry VII.

Sir Hugh Courtenay (1358-1425) inherited the manor of Haccombe from his heiress wife (his 2nd wife) Philippa Archdekne (alias Ercedecne), a daughter and co-heiress of Sir Warin Archdekne (1354-1400), MP. His son and heir by his 3rd wife Matilda Beaumont, was Sir Hugh Courtenay (d.1471) of Boconnoc, who married the heiress Margaret Carminowe. Boconnoc was visited by the antiquary William Worcester (1415-c.1482) who described the house then standing as "Blekennoc House, a turretted old mansion, lately the seat of Sir Hugh Courtenay".

It is believed that Boconnoc reverted to the crown in consequence of an attainder in the Courtenay family, and was later regranted to John Russell, 1st Earl of Bedford (c.1485-1555). It was sold in 1579 by Francis Russell, 2nd Earl of Bedford (1527–1585) to Sir William Mohun, who died seised of it in about 1587. Sir William Mohun was in any case one of the rightful co-heirs of the Courtenay family of Boconnoc.

Edward Courtenay, 1st Earl of Devon (c.1527-1556) was unmarried and childless at the time of his death. The manor and Castle of Tiverton and his other numerous estates devolved to his distant cousins, descended from the four sisters of his great-grandfather Edward Courtenay, 1st Earl of Devon (d.1509), all children of Sir Hugh Courtenay (d.1471) of Boconnoc and his wife, Margaret Carminow. These four sisters were as follows:Prince, biography of Edward Courtenay (d.1556), 1810 edition, p.263
Elizabeth Courtenay, wife of John Trethurffe of Trethurffe in the parish of Ladock, Cornwall.
Maud Courtenay, wife of John Arundell of Talvern
Isabel/Elizabeth Courtenay, wife of William Mohun of Hall in the parish of Lanteglos-by-Fowey in Cornwall, a descendant of John Mohun (d.1322) of Dunster Castle in Somerset, feudal baron of Dunster by his wife Anne Tiptoft.Vivian, Heraldic Visitations of Devon, pp.245, 565, 566, where she is called "Elizabeth", frequently interchangeable with "Isabel" In 1628 her descendant John Mohun (1595–1641) was created by King Charles I Baron Mohun of Okehampton, his ancestor having inherited as his share Okehampton Castle and remnants of the feudal barony of Okehampton, one of the earliest possessions of the Courtenays. The Mohuns' held the manor of Boconnoc not (as might be expected) as a share of the Courtenay inheritance, but by lease from the Russell family, Earls of Bedford.
Florence Courtenay, wife of John Trelawny
Thus the Courtenay estates were divided into four parts. On the death of Edward Courtenay, Earl of Devon, in 1556, the actual heirs to his estates were the following descendants of the four sisters above:
Reginald Mohun (1507/8-67) of Hall in the parish of Lanteglos-by-Fowey in Cornwall, who inherited Okehampton Castle and had leased Boconnoc from the Earl of Bedford. His descendant was John Mohun, 1st Baron Mohun of Okehampton (1595–1641) who was elevated to the peerage by King Charles I as Baron Mohun of Okehampton, in recognition of his ancestor having inherited Okehampton Castle as his share of the Courtenay inheritance.
Margaret Buller; 
John Vivian;  
John Trelawny;

Mohun

The Mohuns of Boconnoc and of Hall in the parish of Lanteglos-by-Fowey, in Cornwall, were a junior branch of the Mohun family, and were descended from John Mohun (d. 1322) of Dunster Castle in Somerset, feudal baron of Dunster by his wife Anne Tiptoft.See pedigree of Mohun of Boconnoc, in Vivian, J. L., ed. (1887). The Visitations of Cornwall: comprising the Heralds' Visitations of 1530, 1573 & 1620; with additions by J.L. Vivian. Exeter: W. Pollard, p.324  William Mohun of Hall married Elizabeth Courtenay, one of the greatest heiresses of her time, one of the four eventual co-heiresses of Edward Courtenay, 1st Earl of Devon (1527–1556) the last of the mediaeval Courtenay Earls of Devon. The Mohun share of the Courtenay inheritance included Boconnoc in Cornwall and Okehampton Castle in Devon, and other remnants of the feudal barony of Okehampton, one of the earliest possessions of the Courtenays.

The grandson of William Mohun of Hall and Elizabeth Courtenay was Reginald Mohun (1507/8–1567) of Hall and Boconnoc, who married Jone Trevanion, daughter of Sir William Trevanion and sister of Sir Hugh Trevanion.

The son of Reginald Mohun and Jone Trevanion was Sir William Mohun (c.1540 – 1588) of Hall and Boconnoc, a Member of Parliament. By his first wife Elizabeth Horsey, the daughter of Sir John Horsey (d. 1564), MP, he had two sons and one daughter, of whom the eldest son and heir was John Mohun, 1st Baron Mohun of Okehampton (1595–1641) who was elevated to the peerage by King Charles I as Baron Mohun of Okehampton, in recognition of his ancestor having inherited Okehampton Castle as his share of the Courtenay inheritance.

The widow of Charles Mohun, 4th Baron Mohun (c.1675-1712) sold Boconnoc to Thomas Pitt (1653-1726).

Pitt

Thomas Pitt (1653-1726) of Blandford St Mary in Dorset, was President of Madras in India and six times a Member of Parliament. He was the grandfather of William Pitt, 1st Earl of Chatham ("Pitt the Elder"), the father of William Pitt the Younger, both prime ministers of Great Britain. Thomas Pitt was a wealthy trader who had made a fortune in India, where he acquired for the sum of £20,400 a large and valuable diamond, known as the "Pitt Diamond" (now the "Regent Diamond"). Having sold it in 1717 to the French Regent, Philippe II, Duke of Orléans, for £135,000, he was able to purchase the Boconnoc estate for £54,000. The "Regent Diamond" is today on display in the Louvre Museum and is valued at about £60 million. He also used his great wealth to acquire political influence which he did by purchasing the rotten boroughs of 
Old Sarum in Wiltshire, where he had the power to nominate both MPs, and Okehampton in Devon, where he had the power to nominate one. He also acquired considerable influence in at least two Cornish boroughs, namely Camelford and Grampound. Many of his family entered Parliament representing these family boroughs. After his death in 1726 the estate passed to his son Robert Pitt (1680-1727), MP, who died one year later in 1727, when the estate descended to his son Thomas Pitt (c.1705-1761), Lord Warden of the Stannaries, the elder brother of William Pitt the Elder, the prime minister.

In 1731 Thomas Pitt (c.1705-1761) of Boconnoc married Christiana Lyttelton, a daughter of Sir Thomas Lyttelton, 4th Baronet, MP, of Hagley in Worcestershire and a sister of George Lyttelton, 1st Baron Lyttelton. His only surviving son was Thomas Pitt, 1st Baron Camelford (1737-1793), of Boconnoc, who developed the china clay mine on the Boconnoc estate, and in 1772 added a south wing to Boconnoc House in the form of a picture gallery (demolished 1971). He died in Italy, but his body was brought home and buried within Boconnoc Church, next to the house.
A monument survives near the house, in the form of a tall granite obelisk, in memory of the antiquary Sir Richard Lyttelton (d.1770), the uncle of the 1st Baron Camelford, who bequeathed him much of his fortune. Inscribed:In gratitude and affection to the memory of Sir Richard Lyttelton and to perpetuate that peculiar character of benevolence which rendered him the delight of his own age and worthy of the veneration of posterity MDCCLXXIThomas Pitt, 2nd Baron Camelford (1775–1804), the son of the 1st Baron, was killed in a duel in 1804, when his heir to Boconnoc became his only sister Anne Pitt (1772-1864) (Lady Grenville), the wife of William Grenville, 1st Baron Grenville, Prime Minister from 1806 to 1807. Her heir was her nephew George Matthew Fortescue (1791-1877).

Fortescue
George Matthew Fortescue (1791-1877) was the second son of Hugh Fortescue, 1st Earl Fortescue of Castle Hill, Filleigh in Devon, by his wife Hester Grenville (1767-1847), a daughter of the Prime Minister George Grenville (1712-1770). In 1833 he married Lady Louisa Elizabeth Ryder (d.1899), the 5th daughter of Dudley Ryder, 1st Earl of Harrowby (1762–1847) (her sister Lady Susan Ryder having married George Matthew Fortescue's elder brother the 2nd Earl Fortescue), and shortly thereafter inherited Boconnoc from his aunt Anne Pitt (1772-1864) (Lady Grenville).
Cyril Dudley Fortescue (1847-1890) of Boconnoc, Lt-Col Coldstream Guards, the third son of George Matthew Fortescue. He died without issue when his heir became his younger brother John Bevill Fortescue (born 1850).
John Bevill Fortescue (born 1850), a barrister, JP and DL for Cornwall, High Sheriff of Cornwall in 1894, who in 1891 married Dorothy Augusta Hoste, a daughter of Admiral Sir William Legge George Hoste, 2nd Baronet (1818–1868). 
John Grenville Fortescue (1896-1969) of Boconnoc (2nd son of John Bevill Fortescue) Coldstream Guards, married Daphne Marjory Bourke, only child of Hon Algernon Henry Bourke, a son of Richard Southwell Bourke, 6th Earl of Mayo. His son and heir was (John) Desmond Grenville Fortescue (1919-2017).
Captain (John) Desmond Grenville Fortescue (1919-2017), Coldstream Guards, JP and DL for Cornwall, and High Sheriff of Cornwall for 1966/7. He married firstly, in 1942, Nina Kendall-Lane, daughter of Ernest Kendall-Lane, and secondly, in 1988, Angela Dorothy England. In 2003 his address was given as "The Stewardry, Boconnoc", having handed over the management of the house to his son Anthony Desmond Grenville Fortescue (1946-2015).
Anthony Desmond Grenville Fortescue (1946-2015) of Boconnoc, High Sheriff of Cornwall, who married Elizabeth Ann Evered Poole, a daughter of Major Campbell Evered Poole. He was found dead in Boconnoc House on 9 November 2015 following a firearms incident. The inquest returned an open verdict. He predeceased his father by two years, and left two daughters and co-heiresses.

Boconnoc House and estate
Boconnoc House (Grade II* listed) was built in the 18th century by two members of the Pitt family: one wing was built c. 1721 by Thomas Pitt, Governor of Madras, and the other in 1772 by Thomas Pitt, 1st Baron Camelford. The two wings formed an L-shape and the grounds are finely landscaped: on a hill behind the house is an obelisk in memory of Sir Richard Lyttelton (1771). During the 19th century the estate passed into the ownership of the Fortescues who made some alterations to the structure in 1883: there are some more recent additions and the south wing was demolished in 1971.

The parish church is behind the house and fairly small: its dedication is unknown. It contains an interesting 15th-century font and a monument to Penelope Mohun, 1637. The modern tower has five sides in the lower part and eight in the upper. Features of interest include a musicians' gallery, the altar table made by Sir Reginald (Raynold) Mohun, 1621, the Jacobean pulpit, and a monument to Penelope Mohun (d.1637) the wife of William Drew.

The estate, surrounding the River Lerryn, contains a deer park, lake, agricultural land and woodland. Parts of the estate are designated as Boconnoc Park Important Plant Area and Boconnoc Park & Woods Site of Special Scientific Interest, noted for its biological characteristics.

The estate includes the largest landscaped deer park in Cornwall, the home of the Boconnoc Cricket Club. In 1993 the estate was used as a location for the film The Three Musketeers.The History of Boconnoc House in Cornwall 

Trecangate

Between 1820 and 1954 a Methodist chapel stood in the hamlet of Trecangate, in the parish of Boconnoc. It was built using cob walls; a sign marking its position was erected in 2009.

Wildlife and ecology
Old-growth, sessile oak (Quercus petraea), growing in ravines and slopes in parts of the ancient deer park at Boconnoc House, contain an internationally important assemblage of lichens, making it one of the most important sites in Europe. The site is also considered to be the best ″old-growth, southern-oceanic oak woodland″ in the south-west.

See also
 Battle of Braddock Down

References

Further reading
Betjeman, John (April 1933) "Two Cornish houses: Glynn; Boconnoc", in: Architectural Review (reprinted in Betjeman's Britain; selected, edited and introduced by Candida Lycett Green. London: John Murray, 1999; pp. 43–51)
Lysons, Daniel & Samuel, Magna Britannia, Vol.3, Cornwall, London, 1814, pp. 24–38 
Gilbert, Davies, (ed.), The Parochial History of Cornwall: Founded on the Manuscript Histories of Mr Hals and Mr Tonkin, Volume 1, London, 1838, p. 63 
Catherine Lorigan, Boconnoc: The History of a Cornish Estate'', 2017
Pedigree of Mohun of Boconnoc, in Vivian, J. L., ed. (1887). The Visitations of Cornwall: comprising the Heralds' Visitations of 1530, 1573 & 1620; with additions by J.L. Vivian. Exeter: W. Pollard, pp. 323–6

External links

 GENUKI website: Boconnoc

Civil parishes in Cornwall
Sites of Special Scientific Interest in Cornwall
Sites of Special Scientific Interest notified in 1977